Metrosideros perforata, also known as white rata, climbing rata, akatea or Akatorotoro, is one of twelve Metrosideros species endemic to New Zealand. It is one of three white flowering rātā vines (the others being large white rātā and white rātā).

 
An example of a specific location of occurrence is within New Zealand's Hamilton Ecological District in association with such alliant understory plants as Blechnum discolor, Blechnum filiforme and Doodia media.

See also 
 carmine/crimson rātā
 Colenso's rātā
 large white rātā
 scarlet rātā
 white rātā

References

External links

perforata
Endemic flora of New Zealand